The 2019 Capital Football season saw a new competition format for the top two men’s divisions in the Australian Capital Territory. The Capital League (former second division) became linked to the National Premier League (first division) with the introduction of a two-step plan to establish promotion and relegation between the two divisions, as well as a re-branding of both divisions to National Premier League 1 (NPL1) and National Premier League 2 (NPL2). The NPL1 Premier qualified for the 2019 National Premier Leagues final series and the Federation Cup winner qualified for the 2019 FFA Cup.

2019 National Premier Leagues Capital Football

Re-branded NPL1 in 2019, this was the ACT’s highest senior men’s division. Nine teams competed, with the team finishing last in NPL1 relegated to NPL2 for the following season.

Finals

Season statistics

Top scorers 

Reference:

2019 National Premier Leagues Capital Football 2 

Replacing the Capital League, 2019 was the first season of NPL2 as the ACT’s second senior men’s division. The competition was a double round-robin played over 18 rounds, with no promotion to the NPL1, followed by an end of season finals competition.

Finals

2019 Capital Football State League 1 

The 2019 ACT Capital Football Division 1 (also known as State League 1) is the fifth edition of the Capital League Division 1 as ACT's third senior men’s division. The 2019 season consists of 18 rounds with four matches played per round.

Finals

2019 Women's National Premier Leagues ACT

The highest tier domestic football competition in the ACT is known as the ACT Women's National Premier Leagues (WNPL). Each team played each other twice for a total of 16 rounds, plus a finals series for the top 4 teams.

Finals

2019 Federation Cup 

2019 was the 57th edition of the Capital Football Federation Cup. The Federation cup acted as the preliminary rounds for the FFA Cup in the ACT, with the Cup winner entering the subsequent FFA Cup round of 32. Although open to all senior men's teams registered with Capital Football, entry to the competition was staggered, with NPL1 clubs entering the tournament in the second round. The competition ran from 5 March until 15 June.

Tigers FC secured its first Federation Cup title and qualification to the 2019 FFA Cup with a penalty shootout victory over Canberra FC at Deakin Stadium.

Notes
 † = After Extra Time

2019 Charity Shield 
2019 is the fourth edition of the annual ACT Charity Shield contested to kick off the 2019 Capital Football season. Money raised from the event goes towards a nominated charity, which in 2019 was Salvation Army Canberra. Canberra FC and Gungahlin United contested the Shield in 2019. The matchup was a replay of the 2018 Federation Cup final. Canberra FC claimed its second Charity Shield title with a 2–1 victory thanks to an unfortunate own goal winner in the fifty-second minute.

See also 

Soccer in the Australian Capital Territory
Sport in the Australian Capital Territory

References 

Capital Football